Volcán Espíritu Santo is a Pleistocene stratovolcano at the center of the San José volcanic group, located at  from Santiago de Chile at the end of the Cajón del Maipo on the Chile-Argentina border. The -wide summit crater of Espíritu Santo volcano overlaps the southern slope of the Marmolejo volcano and partially overlies La Engorda.
The San José complex includes - a part of Espíritu Santo, La Engorda and San José - the Plantat and Marmolejo volcanoes, the latter of which is the highest and located on the North-end of the group.

See also
 List of volcanoes in Argentina
 List of volcanoes in Chile
 San José (volcano)
 Marmolejo

References
 
  (in Spanish; also includes volcanoes of Argentina, Bolivia, and Peru)

Volcanoes of Santiago Metropolitan Region
Mountains of Santiago Metropolitan Region
Mountains of Mendoza Province
Volcanoes of Mendoza Province
Active volcanoes
Principal Cordillera
Pleistocene stratovolcanoes
Stratovolcanoes of Argentina
Stratovolcanoes of Chile